Lydia Shum Din-ha or Lydia Tin Ha Sum (21 July 1945 – 19 February 2008) was a Hong Kong comedian, MC, actress and singer. Known for her portly figure, signature dark rimmed glasses and bouffant hairstyle, she was affectionately known to peers and fans as Fei-fei (lit. "Fat Fat" or "Fatty") or Fei Jie ( lit. "Fat Sister").

Early life 
Shum was born on 21 July 1945 in Shanghai to Shum Yin Gee (1913–1978, with his ancestral home in Shanpei, Ningbo) and Shum Yao Tam Suh (1913–2008).

Career 
Shum entered the Hong Kong entertainment industry at the age of 13 in 1958. She made her film debut in 1960, joining Shaw Brothers as an actress at the age of 15. Shum debuted in When the Peach Blossoms Bloom, a 1960 Mandarin comedy directed by Griffin Yueh Feng. She took some time to adjust to Hong Kong as she found the local Cantonese cuisine very different from that of her native Shanghai.

TVB 

While she worked at Shaw Brothers, her popularity grew and she became one of the first stakeholders in the up-and-coming television broadcast station TVB. In 1967, Shum's stardom took off with the popular variety show Enjoy Yourself Tonight. She first sang in the Cantopop group, the Four Golden Flowers. Later, she played a Shanghai woman in the 1970s. She also sang as the partner of Roman Tam from 1971 to 1973.

By August 1972, she was sufficiently well regarded to be invited to ceremonially ride through the Cross-Harbour Tunnel on its opening day. TVB General Manager Stephen Chan has said that there was no substitute for Lydia Shum, and that every person who worked with her professionally eventually became well known in Hong Kong. Her openness to appearing in sport bikinis and ballet costumes despite her size earned her respect in image-conscious Hong Kong.

Film 
Shum has been established mainly as a comic and dramatic actress but is not limited to films in those genres. Kung fu fans will recognize her from her role as Yuen Cheung-Yan's dominating wife in the film Drunken Tai Chi. She also appeared as Richard Ng's wife in the all-star comedy Millionaire's Express, as well as a major role in the successful four movie series It's a Mad, Mad, Mad World. Her 1997 film Fitness Tour utilised her weight for its plot.

She took a leave from her movie career that same year, and hosted a talk show on Hong Kong, along with numerous telethons and variety shows on TVB.

In 1976, Shum co-directed You Are Wonderful. Shum's last film was In-Laws Outlaws, a 2004 Cantonese comedy film directed by Clifton Ko Chi-Sum. Shum is credited with over 175 films.

Asia region 
Shum starred in Singapore's Channel 5 sitcom Living with Lydia (while credited as Lydia Sum) and Cantonese series like Slim Chances (我要Fit一Fit). Her performance in Living with Lydia won her the "Best Comedy Performance by an Actress" award at the 2003 Asian Television Awards. It was also the first time she had acted in an English sitcom with a multi-camera format, though a laugh track was used.

Personal life 
Lydia Shum was the sister of fashion designer Alfred Sung. Shum married actor and singer Adam Cheng Siu-chow in January 1985 after 11 years of cohabitation. Prior to the marriage, in December 1984 Shum was asked by her good friend Lee Heung Kam to fly to San Francisco for the opening ceremony of Lee's shop.  Shum, who was in Taiwan with Cheng at the time, was reluctant to do so initially, but three days later, Shum left for San Francisco. When she returned to Taiwan, she heard rumors that Cheng was having an affair. Upon being asked about this, Cheng denied having a relationship with another woman and suggested marriage. Shum believed that a marriage would deter any woman from becoming close to Cheng. On 5 January 1985, Cheng and Shum flew to Vancouver, British Columbia, Canada to get married.

Due to the hurried circumstances of their marriage and Shum's proportions being outside standard clothing sizes, there was insufficient time to prepare a wedding gown. Shum wore a Chinese cheongsam instead, and later said in a 2006 interview in Hong Kong that one of her greatest regrets was not wearing a wedding gown for her wedding. 

On 30 May 1987, Joyce Cheng Yan-Yee was born to Shum and Adam Cheng. Eight months after their daughter was born, Cheng and Shum divorced.

Health problems and subsequent death 
Shum had several serious chronic ailments: cholangitis,
diabetes, and hypertension. In 2002, she was admitted to the Queen Mary Hospital (QMH) in Hong Kong and had 36 gallstones extracted. In September 2006, Shum was diagnosed with a liver tumor and cancer around the gallbladder. Doctors immediately removed one third of her liver.

Prior to a cholecystectomy done in 2002, she had bile duct inflammation in 1978 and again in 1989. On 22 September 2006, the inflammation recurred. Four days later, it had complicated her liver and she went into a coma until 1 October. Once again, on 29 January 2007, she entered the operating room to remove a liver tumor which weighed 2.7 kg. On 8 March 2007, the tumor was found to be growing so she had another surgery. 

On 1 November 2006, a 24-year-old Indonesian domestic helper, Triyuliarti Yuyun, was convicted of violating the Hospital Authority Ordinance and sentenced to four weeks in jail. Yuyun entered a ward at the Queen Mary Hospital (QMH) on 1 October 2006 where Shum had been receiving treatment, and attempted to take photographs of Shum. Later, it was confirmed that Yuyun was working for an employee of the local magazine East Week, but she had not been authorised to take photographs of Shum. Senior management of East Week did not approve of the action and offered an apology to Shum. Magistrate Colin Mackintosh determined that Yuyun's actions were premeditated and done for financial gain, and that the serious infringement of the patient's privacy warranted a custodial sentence. On that occasion, Shum was discharged from the hospital in July 2007.
On 11 October 2007, Shum collapsed at home with pleural effusion, and was rushed to Queen Elizabeth Hospital (QE) for emergency treatment. Later that day, Shum was transferred to QMH. She was discharged from that hospital on 16 October 2007.

Shum was admitted to the intensive care ward of QMH on 22 January 2008 and checked out four days later. Shum's mother died in Canada while Shum was in hospital. She was once again admitted to the intensive care ward of QMH on 2 February 2008, where her condition worsened. On 19 February, at 3 am, her family decided that Shum's life support should be withdrawn. It was decided that her breathing apparatus would be removed and that her family spend time with her by her bedside. Shum died at 8:38 a.m. local time that day.
Prior to her death, she had liver cancer for two years. As part of the treatment for her illness, she underwent chemotherapy and several rounds of kidney dialysis treatment.
On 24 February 2008, escorted by her daughter Joyce, Shum's body was flown on a Cathay Pacific passenger flight from Hong Kong to Vancouver, British Columbia, Canada. On 27 February, Shum was buried at Burnaby's Forest Lawn Memorial Park in a private ceremony. Video footage of the funeral was played at a memorial event at the Hong Kong Coliseum on 2 March.

Fei-fei Day 
Fei-fei Day was proclaimed in Vancouver, British Columbia, Canada, for 1 June 2008 (Shum's Chinese lunar calendar birthday). Mayor Sam Sullivan proclaimed this memorial day in Vancouver on 26 February 2008, a week after Shum's death. On 21 July 2022 she is featured as a Google Doodle.

Filmography

Films 
This is a partial list of films.
 1965 The Lotus Lamp
 1967 A Girl's Secret 
 1967 Broadcast Queen 
 1967 Every Girl a Romantic Dreamer – Sai.
 1967 Finding a Wife in a Blind Way 
 1967 The Flying Killer (aka Chivalrous Girl in the Air) – Chow Mei-Ha.
 1967 Happy Years – Cheung Lan.
 1967 The Iron Lady Against the One-eyed Dragon
 1967 Three Women in a Factory – Chow Siu-Yuk.
 1967 Waste Not Our Youth – Fei Fei.
 1967 Unforgettable First Love 
 1968 Lady Songbird
 1968 Happy Years
 1968 Four Gentlemanly Flowers
 1968 A Blundering Detective and a Foolish Thief
 1968 Won't You Give Me a Kiss?
 1968 Teenage Love
 1968 Wonderful Youth
 1968 We All Enjoy Ourselves Tonight
 1969 Moments of Glorious Beauty
 1969 The Little Warrior
 1969 Teddy Girls – Yeung Siu-Kiu.
 1969 To Catch a Cat
 1969 A Big Mess
 1969 One Day at a Time
 1970 Secret Agent No. 1 
 1970 Happy Times
 1970 The Mad Bar
 1971 The Invincible Eight
 1972 Songs and Romance Forever
 1973 The Private Eye
 1973 Love Is a Four Letter Word
 1973 If Tomorrow Comes
 1973 The House of 72 Tenants – Shanghai Po.
 1974 The Country Bumpkin
 1974 Tenants of Talkative Street
 1974 Lovable Mr. Able
 1974 The Crazy Instructor
 1974 The Country Bumpkin in Style
 1974 Kissed by the Wolves 
 1975 Pretty Swindler
 1975 Don't Call Me Uncle
 1975 Sup Sap Bup Dup
 1976 You are Wonderful – also director
 1976 Love in Hawaii
 1977 The Great Man
 1982 Cat vs Rat
 1984 Drunken Tai Chi
 1986 The Millionaire's Express
 1987 It's a Mad, Mad, Mad World
 1987 Mr. Handsome (1987)
 1988 Tiger on the Beat [cameo]
 1988 Double Fattiness
 1988 Mother vs. Mother
 1988 King of Stanley Market
 1988 Faithfully Yours
 1988 It's a Mad, Mad, Mad World II
 1989 The Bachelor's Swan-Song
 1989 City Squeeze
 1989 Eat a Bowl of Tea
 1989 It's a Mad, Mad, Mad World III 1989 Lost Souls 1991 The Banquet 1991 The Perfect Match 1992 It's a Mad, Mad, Mad World Too 1993 The Laughter of Water Margins 1993 Perfect Couples 1993 He Ain't Heavy, He's My Father 1995 Just Married 1997 Fitness Tour 1997 Happy Together [2]
 2001 The Stamp of Love 2001–2005 Living with Lydia 2003 Miss Du Shi Niang 2004 In-Laws, Out-Laws 2006 Where Are They Now?''

References

External links 
 
 Lydia Shum at senscritique.com
Best Comedy Award

1945 births
2008 deaths
Actresses from Shanghai
Deaths from cancer in Hong Kong
Canadian people of Hong Kong descent
Deaths from liver cancer
Hong Kong Buddhists
20th-century Hong Kong women singers
Hong Kong contraltos
Hong Kong film actresses
Hong Kong Mandopop singers
Hong Kong television actresses
Singers from Shanghai
Actresses from Vancouver
TVB veteran actors
20th-century Hong Kong actresses
21st-century Hong Kong actresses
Hong Kong women comedians